Ola Skaalvik Elvevold (born 12 June 1988 in Tromsø) is a Norwegian environmentalist. He is a former chairman of Natur og Ungdom. Prior to his leadership he had been deputy chairman since 2008.

References

1988 births
Living people
Norwegian environmentalists
Nature and Youth activists